ShopRite  is a retailers' cooperative of supermarkets with stores in six states: Connecticut, Delaware, Maryland, New Jersey, New York and Pennsylvania.

Based in Keasbey, New Jersey, ShopRite consists of 50 individually owned and operated affiliates with over 300 stores, all under its corporate and distribution arm, Wakefern Food Corporation. Wakefern itself owns and operates 28 of the locations through subsidiary ShopRite Supermarkets and is the largest affiliate within the cooperative. Several Wakefern members own and operate single ShopRite stores, while most own multiple locations.  The average Wakefern member operates six stores.

ShopRite has been the largest food retailer in New Jersey for close to 70 years and is also number one in the entire New York metropolitan area. Since 2011, ShopRite is also the largest retailer of food in Greater Philadelphia, pushing long-dominant Acme Markets to second place and, in 2013, to third place. , Wakefern was ranked 17th by sales among all supermarket operators in the United States. In a 2022 survey by Newsweek, ShopRite was named the “Most Trusted Grocery Retailer” in the Northeast.

History

Early beginnings

ShopRite originated in 1946, when a Del Monte Foods sales representative talked to independent grocers in Newark, New Jersey. The grocers were having problems getting reasonable prices for wholesale goods. The Del Monte representative suggested the grocers try cooperative buying. Seven of the grocers agreed, paying $1,000 each to launch Wakefern Food Corp., which was incorporated on December 5, 1946. In 1951, the name ShopRite was created.

In 1958, ShopRite cut prices by 10% as an alternative to giving away trading stamps, which other supermarkets in New Jersey were doing. The move was successful, drawing customers and helping create more ShopRite stores. By 1961, ShopRite had 70 members, totaling $100 million in annual sales.

The breakaway of Supermarkets General

One large member, Supermarkets General, pulled out of Wakefern in the late 1960s, halving the number of stores. The Supermarkets General stores became Pathmark in 1968. The remaining Wakefern members redoubled their efforts, adopted "one member, one vote" as a management principle, and expanded aggressively. By the late 1970s, the volume lost from Supermarkets General's departure was restored.

For many years, ShopRite and Pathmark were extremely competitive on price in the New York Metro area, and each one had its loyal customer base. A highly leveraged management buy-out in the late 1980s left Pathmark saddled with too much debt, and the supermarket chain had no cash to fix up its stores, or invest in lower prices. At the same time, ShopRite stores were being replaced and rebuilt, stealing market share away from Pathmark.

The Pathmark chain was sold to A&P in 2007. A&P ran Pathmark as a division, but was unsuccessful in turning around the banner's fortunes. A&P filed for bankruptcy and sold or liquidated its stores in 2015, including approximately 150 Pathmark stores. Wakefern and its cooperative members acquired nine Pathmark locations along with several other former A&P banners with the intention of opening ShopRite, Price Rite and The Fresh Grocer locations.

The "Can-Can Sale"

In 1971, ShopRite introduced their Can-Can Sale, where canned goods (and eventually other products) were placed on steep discounts, and is held in January.  Until the early 1990s, the sale was held in the second and third weeks of January but expanded to the entire month. Animated commercials for this promotion feature a chorus line of cancan dancers and a French artiste, though the style changed on several occasions over the years.  In 2002, ShopRite expanded that sale to twice a year when they introduced the Summer Can-Can Sale, held in July.

In 2018, the Summer Can-Can Sale was discontinued, replaced with the "Can It Get Any Hotter?" sale.

Price Plus Club and beyond
In 1989, ShopRite introduced the Price Plus Club Card, which eventually merged with the Check Cashing Card (for those that use it for that purpose as well); it is free of charge to acquire. Having a Price Plus Card enables shoppers to receive special weekly discounts, listed in circulars mailed with local newspapers. Most sales are chain-wide regardless of owner but sometimes in a particular region, valid for all area ShopRites, however some stores choose to put special items on sale based on stock. The Price Plus Card also tracks purchases and use of rewards.

In 1996, ShopRite launched its own line (with Dietz & Watson) of deli meats, cheeses and complements with its private label, Black Bear of the Black Forest, to compete against the expansion of Boar's Head in competitor's supermarkets. In 2011, over 15 million pounds of Black Bear slicing meats and cheeses were sold at ShopRite.

Since 1999, ShopRite has offered an online grocery shopping service at select stores, under the service name Order. Pickup. Deliver. (formerly ShopRite from Home until April 2022.) For an additional fee, customers can place an order for pickup or delivery through the ShopRite website or mobile app, ShopRite employees then fulfill a customer's shopping order at a local ShopRite with options for curbside pickup.

ShopRite Stores Design

As a result of the cooperative system, there is no set format for building architecture, store layout, or color scheme of storefronts. Most stores are the product of the era in which they were opened, and the owner's style. For example, the ShopRite of West Caldwell, New Jersey, owned by Sunrise ShopRite, has a Japanese motif inside and outside of the store (including rickshaws, an exit sign reading "Sayonara" and two Japanese-style phone booths). The RoNetco family of stores (Netcong, Byram, Newton, Franklin, Sparta, Flanders, Mansfield, and Succasunna, New Jersey) have different looks on the outside (including the shopping carts and cart corrals), although the stores themselves have a similar layout. ShopRite stores that were previously other stores usually contain elements of the previous occupants. As large corporations buy up stores, recent years have brought a homogenization in building design and store layout.

The ShopRite system today
Currently, ShopRite's base stretches northeast from the Washington metropolitan area in Maryland to the Hartford area in Connecticut, extending as far north as New York's Capital District. While New Jersey is home to the most ShopRite stores, the chain also has a strong presence in the New York City suburbs, and in Pennsylvania (mostly in the Philadelphia area). In 2010, ShopRite expanded its presence in Connecticut through the purchase of 11 former Shaw's stores.

In 2011–2013, ShopRite returned to the New York Capital District after exiting the market 23 years earlier.  The SRS operating division opened stores in Niskayuna, Albany, Slingerlands, Colonie and North Greenbush. The Albany store opened on April 26, 2012; the Slingerlands store opened on September 30, 2012; and the Colonie store opened on April 7, 2013.  The most recent addition was the North Greenbush location, which opened in December 2017.  ShopRite currently has gas stations at the Albany and Colonie locations.  Plans for additional future store locations had not been announced in late 2010. In 2013, ShopRite was the only unionized supermarket in the area.

On July 20, 2015, competitor A&P filed for chapter 11 bankruptcy and announced plans to close or sell off all of its stores. ShopRite acquired 13 supermarkets in A&P's bankruptcy auction, including some that had been ShopRite locations before Supermarkets General (later acquired by A&P) broke off from the cooperative.

On January 26, 2021, ShopRite announced that it would close 62 pharmacies in its stores.

Slogans
Why Pay More? Shop at a ShopRite store!
Hey, Mom, what’s for dinner? ShopRite has the answer! (1970s–1980s, still used in some stores on the in-store audio system)
ShopRite Does It Right (1980s–1994)
ShopRite does the Can Can, Selling lots of brands (1971–present)
We Save You (more) Money! ShopRite Does it Right! (until 1994)
ShopRite and Always Save (1994–96; alternate until 1999)
Hey Mom, What's for Dinner? ShopRite Has the Answer! (1996–99; is still used, even with the current logo, on sale tags for Meats, Seafood, Delicatessen, etc.)
Always Fresh...Always for Less! (1999–2008)
One Place. Your Place. (2008–2012)
It Makes a Difference Where You Shop (2012)
We're All About Food. We're All About Savings. We're All About You. (2012–2019)
Shop smart, shop six feet apart. (2020–2021)
Helping you get it together, together (2021–present)
Check out happy (2022-present)

Other chains and concepts

Price Rite

Wakefern also manages its wholly owned subsidiary, Price Rite, which is a limited-assortment chain of stores found only in Connecticut, Maryland, Massachusetts, New Jersey, New York, Pennsylvania, New Hampshire, Virginia, and Rhode Island. As of April 2018, there are currently 66 Price Rite stores; 63 of those are owned outright by Wakefern.

Price Rite in New Jersey
The Price Rite stores in New Jersey are operated individually by Wakefern's cooperative members; in 2014, Wakefern announced that the Price Rite banner would be made available to all of those members, so they can open and operate their own outlets. The North Jersey locations, in Garfield and Paterson, are operated by Inserra Supermarkets, while the South Jersey location, in Camden, operated by the Ravitz Family closed in 2021.

Price Rite Warehouse Clubs (defunct)
The Price Rite name was first used in the early 1990s on Wakefern's failed warehouse club concept stores.

ShopRite Garden Center (defunct)
For many years, Foodarama operated a very small ShopRite Garden Center on Route 130 in East Windsor, New Jersey. In 2004, with the construction of a massive Home Depot directly adjacent to the small store, a decision was made to close the store and Foodarama moved its garden center operations into a  former Frank's Nursery & Crafts store. The ShopRite Garden Center closed in 2008.

ShopRite Wines & Spirits
 Wakefern members also operate a cooperative chain of stores which offer wine, beer and spirits called ShopRite Wines & Spirits.  Most stores are located adjacent to or inside of ShopRite Supermarkets; however, there are several freestanding stores. One store (in Pennington, New Jersey) offers a bar inside the ShopRite store.
Members operate 38 ShopRite Wine and Spirits Shops in New Jersey and New York. One in particular, the Clinton, NJ store, is owned by QuickChek.

Sunrise ShopRites of West Caldwell also operates three (Parsippany, New Jersey, Caldwell, New Jersey and Westfield, New Jersey) ShopRite Sunrise Wine-Cellar locations which offer an expanded selection of high-quality and specialty wines. These stores are generally smaller than their normal ShopRite counterparts, and specialize in wines and related alcoholic beverages.

ShopRiteDelivers.com
In December 2013, Wakefern launched the ShopRiteDelivers.com website to expand their digital footprint outside of their traditional markets in the Northeast. The website, focused on electronics, bulk order baby care, specialty foods, and health and beauty, has been well received, and has shipped orders to customers in all 50 states.

The Fresh Grocer

Wakefern acquired the trademarks of this supermarket chain, which operates primarily in the Philadelphia area when its former owner, Pat Burns, joined the cooperative as its 50th member in August 2013. At the time, the chain had eight stores: five in Philadelphia, one in suburban Upper Darby, one in Wilmington, Delaware, and one in New Brunswick, N.J. The Upper Darby store became a ShopRite, and the New Brunswick and Southwest Philadelphia stores have since closed. The Fresh Grocer stores are smaller than modern ShopRite stores and place a greater emphasis on fresh and organic foods, upscale specialty items and extensive prepared-foods offerings than regular ShopRite stores, giving Wakefern and its members a format that can work in smaller urban locations. Wakefern executives were also quoted in the press as saying that as several The Fresh Grocer stores are located near college campuses, the chain would give Wakefern "new insight into the next generation of consumers" and enable it to reach new customers.

Naming rights
ShopRite is the title sponsor for the ShopRite LPGA Classic.

Partial list of ShopRite operating companies
Some ShopRite members are not listed in this section.

AJS Supermarkets – Operates one store in Hillside, New Jersey.
Ammons Supermarkets Inc – Operates ShopRite stores in Mullica Hill, New Jersey and two stores in Philadelphia, Pennsylvania on Aramingo Ave. and on Bridge St. and Harbison Ave.  Also has a PriceRite store in Philadelphia that opened in 2016.
Bill's Shoprite – Operates three stores - Mt. Pocono, Covington Township, and Moosic, Pennsylvania.
Bottino's Supermarkets – Operates four stores - Washington Township, Vineland, Upper Deerfield, and Millville, New Jersey.
Brookdale ShopRite, Inc. – Operates two stores - Bloomfield and Newark, New Jersey.
Brown's Super Stores Inc. (Headquartered in Westville, New Jersey) – Operates 10 ShopRite stores in Pennsylvania and one store in New Jersey. Brown's has six stores in the City of Philadelphia, including two in South Philadelphia, two in West Philadelphia, one in Nicetown-Tioga, and one in Roxborough. They operate four stores in the Pennsylvania suburbs including Bensalem, Cheltenham, East Norriton, Fairless Hills and one store in Brooklawn, New Jersey.
Buonadonna ShopRite – Operates three stores - Bay Shore, Massapequa and West Babylon, Long Island, New York.
Colligas Family Markets – Operates one store in South Philadelphia, Pennsylvania
Collins Family Markets – Operates five stores - Philadelphia (two), Eddystone, a former Pathmark in Glenolden, Pennsylvania and Glen Burnie, Maryland.
Cuellar Family Markets - owns and operates a ShopRite in Passaic, New Jersey and a separate ShopRite Wines and Spirits store in neighboring Clifton.
Drust Markets – Operates two stores - Wallingford (moved from Meriden in June 2010) and Southington, Connecticut.
Eickhoff Supermarkets – Operates five stores - Delran, Hainesport, Mount Laurel, Cinnaminson, and Burlington, New Jersey.
Five Star Supermarkets – Operates two stores - New London, and Norwich, Connecticut.
Food Parade (Headquartered in Plainview, New York, operates as Greenfield's ShopRite) – Operates five stores on Long Island: Plainview, Woodbury, Commack, Bethpage and New Hyde Park (the latter two former Pathmark locations).
Glass Gardens (Headquartered in Rochelle Park, New Jersey) – Operates 11 stores: Rochelle Park, New Jersey, Paramus, New Jersey, Englewood, New Jersey, Wharton, New Jersey, Linden, New Jersey, Perth Amboy, New Jersey, Rockaway, New Jersey; Brooklyn (2 locations), College Point, Queens and Pearl River, New York.
Grade A Supermarkets (Headquartered in Norwalk, Connecticut) – Operates 11 stores in: Norwalk, Stamford (four stores), Brookfield, Southbury, Shelton, Derby, Fairfield, and Danbury.
Inserra Supermarkets (Headquartered in Mahwah, New Jersey) – 22 stores: Lyndhurst, New Jersey, Hackensack, New Jersey, Lodi, New Jersey, Fair Lawn, New Jersey, Jersey City, New Jersey, Ramsey, New Jersey, Emerson, New Jersey, Hillsdale, New Jersey, New Milford, New Jersey, Northvale, New Jersey, Wayne, New Jersey, West Milford, New Jersey, Hoboken, New Jersey, Bayonne, New Jersey, North Bergen, New Jersey, Palisades Park, New Jersey; New City, Stony Point, NY, Wallington, New Jersey, West Nyack, New York, Garnerville, New York, and Wyckoff, New Jersey. Also owns Price Rite stores in Garfield, New Jersey and Paterson, New Jersey.
Janson Supermarkets – Two stores: Hauppauge and Patchogue, Long Island.
Joseph Family Markets – Two stores in Canton and West Hartford, Connecticut.
Kenny Family ShopRites – Six stores in Delaware, including three in Wilmington, two in Newark, and one in Bear.
Kinsley's Markets – Operates one store in Brodheadsville, Pennsylvania.
Klein's Supermarkets – Nine stores, including six in Harford County, Maryland: two in Bel Air; plus Forest Hill, Whiteford, Aberdeen, and Belcamp. two in Baltimore County, Maryland: one store in Phoenix and one store in Parkville.
KTM Supermarkets – Two locations in Hatfield and West Chester, Pennsylvania.
Mannix Family SuperMarkets – Three on Staten Island, New York.
McMenamin's Stores – Operates two stores in Philadelphia: one at Boulevard Plaza, located on Roosevelt Boulevard and one at Morrell Plaza, located on Frankford Avenue.
Milford Markets – Operates seven stores in East Haven, Hamden, Milford, Orange, Stratford, Cromwell and Clinton, Connecticut.
Miller Farms Family Markets – Operates one store in Enfield, Connecticut.
Nutley Park ShopRite – Operates two stores: one in Nutley, New Jersey and one in Belleville, New Jersey (a former Pathmark which opened in 2013)
RoNetco Supermarkets (Headquartered in Ledgewood, New Jersey) – Operates eight stores: Flanders, New Jersey, Netcong, New Jersey, Byram Township, New Jersey, Newton, New Jersey, Franklin, New Jersey, Sparta Township, New Jersey, Mansfield, New Jersey, and Succasunna, New Jersey.
Saker ShopRites, Inc. (Headquartered in Holmdel, New Jersey) – Operates 40 World Class ShopRites across central New Jersey as well as two liquor stores, a Bakery Commissary, a Prepared Foods Commissary and a Meat and Provisions Commissary. Stores include Marlboro, Neptune City, Bound Brook, Somerville, Branchburg, Lawrenceville, East Windsor, Ewing, Hamilton Marketplace, Woodbridge, North Brunswick, Pennington, Piscataway, Ernston Road, Hamilton Square, Bordentown, Edison, East Brunswick, Toms River (Route 37 and Fischer Bay), Freehold, Aberdeen, West Long Branch, Hazlet, Middletown,    Wall, Howell, Belmar, Brick, Montgomery, East Brunswick, South Plainfield, Lanoka Harbor, New Jersey, Bayville, New Jersey, Jackson, New Jersey, Manchester, New Jersey, Manahawkin, New Jersey, and Waretown, New Jersey. 
(The Fischer Bay, Bayville, Manchester, Lanoka Harbor, Waretown, Jackson and Manahawkin locations were previously owned by the Perlmutter family until December 2021.)
ShopRite of Hunterdon County – Operates five stores in Bethlehem, Pennsylvania, Clinton Township, New Jersey, Flemington, New Jersey, Greenwich Township, New Jersey and Yardley, Pennsylvania.
ShopRite of Kearny – Operates one store in Kearny, New Jersey.
ShopRite of Lincoln Park – Operates one store in Lincoln Park, New Jersey.
ShopRite of Little Falls (Headquartered in Little Falls, New Jersey) - Owned and operated by the Infusino family since 1946. Operates its one store in Little Falls on Browertown Road.
ShopRite of Oakland, Inc. – Operates one store in Oakland, New Jersey.
ShopRite of Pennington (Headquartered in Pennington, New Jersey) – Operates approximately five stores.
ShopRite of Warminster, LLC – Operates one store located at 942 W Street Rd, Warminster, PA 18974.
ShopRite Supermarkets, Inc. (Headquartered in Florida, New York and wholly owned by the Wakefern cooperative) – Operates 35 corporately owned-and-operated ShopRites (including those taken over from Big V Stores): Clark, and Spotswood, New Jersey. Albany, Bedford Hills, Colonie, Carmel, Chester, Croton, Ellenville, Fishkill, Hudson, Kingston, Liberty, Middletown (two), Monroe, Montgomery, Monticello, Scarsdale, White Plains, Newburgh, New Paltz, New Rochelle, North Greenbush, Peekskill, Thornwood, Vails Gate, Town of Poughkeepsie, Niskayuna, Slingerlands, Warwick, and Yonkers (two), New York. Matamoras, Pennsylvania
Sitar ShopRite - Operates the ShopRite of Carteret
Sunrise ShopRite (Headquartered in West Caldwell, New Jersey) – Operates two stores, including the famous Japanese-inspired ShopRite of West Caldwell, New Jersey and another store in Parsippany, New Jersey.
Supermarkets of Cherry Hill (Headquartered in Cherry Hill, New Jersey) – Operates five Southern New Jersey stores: Cherry Hill (two stores), Marlton and Mount Laurel (two stores).
Torna ShopRites – Operates two stores in Bristol, Connecticut and Waterbury, Connecticut.
Village Super Markets (Headquartered in Springfield, New Jersey) – Operates a total of 30 ShopRite branded stores in New Jersey, The Bronx, New York, Maryland and Pennsylvania. The company recently branched outside of the ShopRite brand by acquiring New York City supermarket brands Gourmet Garage with three stores and Fairway Market with five stores all of which are located in the Borough of Manhattan. Village Super Markets is the only Wakefern member to have its stock traded on the NASDAQ market.
Waverly Markets – Operates three stores in Manchester, Vernon and East Hartford, Connecticut.
Zallie's ShopRite Supermarkets – Began in the 1950s when Zallie's founder, George Zallie, opened a one-checkout store in Port Richmond, Philadelphia, Pennsylvania. The company now operates eight stores in New Jersey and one in Philadelphia: Medford, Berlin, Lawnside, Clementon, Laurel Springs, Williamstown, West Deptford Township, Sicklerville, Glassboro and Knorr St., Mayfair, Philadelphia, Pennsylvania.

References

External links

ShopRite Partners In Caring
Wakefern Corporate Site

Woodbridge Township, New Jersey
Companies based in Middlesex County, New Jersey
Economy of the Northeastern United States
Supermarkets of the United States
Companies formerly listed on the Nasdaq
American companies established in 1946
Retail companies established in 1946
Retailers' cooperatives in the United States
Wakefern Food Corporation
1946 establishments in New Jersey